Wallerberdina Station, most commonly known simply as Wallerberdina, is a pastoral lease that operates as a cattle station in South Australia.

It shares a boundary with Yappala Station and Moralana Station.

The station is mostly made up of open terrain of supporting vegetation such as blue bush, cotton bush, black oak, copperburr, native clovers with sandy ridges. Permanent water is available to stock from reticulation drawn from Hookina Creek and two bores. It is equipped with a four stand shearing shed, cattle and sheep years, quarters for 12 workers, and a four bedroom homestead. The property is suitable for sheep or cattle, with annual average carrying equivalent 6000 sheep or 400 cattle.

The property was established some time prior to 1878, at which time it was stocked with sheep and producing wool, and was owned by Gooch and Hayward.
By 1879 the property was owned by Messrs. Hayward, Armstrong and Browne, who were selling merino wethers. In 1880 the lease was to lose  of land that was to be resumed by the government. The resumption had taken effect by 1887.

In 2015 it was owned by South Australian Senator and Liberal Party president Grant Chapman.

In 2015 Wallerberdina was short-listed as one of three potential sites for the National Radioactive Waste Management Facility. A decision is expected in 2019 but the process is controversial.

See also
List of ranches and stations

References

Stations (Australian agriculture)
Pastoral leases in South Australia
Far North (South Australia)